North Dakota Highway 49 (ND 49) is a  north–south state highway in the U.S. state of North Dakota. ND 49's southern terminus is a continuation as South Dakota Highway 73 (SD 73) at the South Dakota border, and the northern terminus is at ND 200 north of Beulah.

Major intersections

References

External links

 The North Dakota Highways Page by Chris Geelhart
 North Dakota Signs by Mark O'Neil

049
Transportation in Sioux County, North Dakota
Transportation in Grant County, North Dakota
Transportation in Morton County, North Dakota
Transportation in Mercer County, North Dakota